The Radical Movement (MR), officially the Radical, Social and Liberal Movement, was a liberal, radical and social-liberal  political party in France.

The party aimed at being an "alternative to the right–left paradigm".

History 
The Radical Party (PR) was founded in 1901 as the Republican, Radical and Radical-Socialist Party. In 1972, the left-wing of the party split and formed the Radical Party of the Left (PRG). The two parties were part of different political alliances, with the PR part of the centre-right, successively the Union for French Democracy, Union for a Popular Movement and Union of Democrats and Independents, while the PRG allied with the Socialist Party on the centre-left, with PRG leader Sylvia Pinel contesting the Socialist Party presidential primary in January 2017.

The idea for a united Radical Party was promoted in June 2017 after the presidential election in which Emmanuel Macron won the presidential election as the candidate for the centrist La République En Marche!.

The two parties were officially merged into the MR on 10 December 2017.

The party joined the Alliance of Liberals and Democrats for Europe on 9 November 2018. The LGBT association GayLib joined the party on 18 June 2018.

In February 2019, faction of ex-PRG members, including its last president Sylvia Pinel, split from the Radical Movement due to its expected alliance with La République En Marche in the European elections and plans to resurrect the PRG, who will meet on 16 March to move toward the reconstitution of the old party.

In 2021 its president Laurent Hénart announced that the Radical Movement would "become again" the Radical Party.

Ideology 
There were eight core ideas that the party stated at the founding congress.
 Freedom
 Equality 
 Fraternity 
 Secularism 
 Security
 Environmental protection
 Commitment to Europe
 Humanism

Election results

European Parliament

See also 
 Liberalism and radicalism in France

References

External links
Official website

2017 establishments in France
Centrist parties in France
Liberal parties in France
Political parties established in 2017
Political parties disestablished in 2021
Political parties of the French Fifth Republic
Pro-European political parties in France
Radical parties in France
Republican parties
Republicanism in France
Social liberal parties